HMS Acteon (or Actaeon), was the brig Actéon, launched in France in 1804 as the second of the two-ship Lynx-class. The British Royal Navy captured her in 1805 but laid her up. The Navy finally commissioned her in 1809. She was at the British invasion of Île de France and later served in the Channel, the North Sea, the Baltic, and the Chesapeake. She was broken up in 1816.

French service and capture
She was built to plans by Pierre-Jacques-Nicolas Rolland and commissioned on 14 June 1804. She was stationed in Île-d'Aix Roads.

On 11 January 1805, she departed Rochefort under Lieutenant Depoge to join up with Admiral Missiessy's squadron, bound for the Caribbean. She returned to Rochefort on 20 May.

British records state that on 2 October 1805  captured the French brig-sloop Actéon, under Capitaine de frégate Depoge, off Rochefort. She was armed with sixteen 6-pounder guns and had a crew of 126 men. Actéon had on board a colonel and some recruits, as well as arms and clothing for a regiment in the West Indies. The navy took Actéon into service as HMS Acteon.

British service
After Actéon arrived at Portsmouth the navy laid her up in ordinary.

In February 1809 Commander Ralph Viscount Neville commissioned her at Portsmouth. Between June and September Acteon underwent a Very Small Repair.

, under the command of Commander Phillip Browne, was off the Scilly Isles on 6 November, when she sighted a brig (Acteon) chasing a lugger. Plover joined in, with  joining later. After a chase of almost four hours, Plover came alongside the lugger, which surrendered. The lugger proved to be the French privateer Lézard, of Saint Malo. She was pierced for 14 guns, but had none aboard when captured. She and her crew of 57 men had sailed from Île de Batz the night before but had not made any capture. Browne credited Acteon and Orestes with having blocked Lézards escape. Lastly, Browne further reported that the three British men-of-war had recaptured the English ship Weymouth, from Gibraltar, shortly before she could reach Aber Wrac'h. After her recapture she arrived at Scilly where she described her captor as having had six guns and a crew of 63 men.

In February 1810 there occurred an unfortunate incident of friendly fire. As the packet Princess Elizabeth, Kidd, master, was sailing to Lisbon she encountered a naval brig and an engagement developed that lasted about two-and-a-half hours. Eventually Kidd decided that further resistance was useless and ceased firing. When the boarding party from the brig arrived at Princess Elizabeth both sides realized the mistake. The brig was Acteon. Kidd had prepared the mails for jettisoning but had not yet given the order that it be thrown overboard when it became clear that the brig was English. Fortunately, there were no casualties aboard the packet and no loss of mail. Kidd believed that it was possible that there were wounded aboard Acteon. Princess Elizabeth arrived at Lisbon on 28 February and was due to sail back to London on 4 March.

On 23 May the French ship Susan and Sarah arrived at Plymouth from Île de France. She and her "very valuable Cargo" were a prize to Acteon.

On 15 July Nivelle sailed Acteon for the Cape of Good Hope. By 21 November she was off the island of Rodrigues preparing for a joint naval and military expedition to take Île de France. The invasion fleet, under Admiral Albemarle Bertie, arrived at Île de France on the 28th;  the capitulation was signed on the 3 December.

Admiral Bertie appointed his nephew, Bertie Cornelius Cator, to command of Acteon.

Earlier Lieutenant Bertie Cator had been appointed to command the transport "Bombay ". (The navy had temporarily engaged four transports as hired armed ships and put naval officers in charge of each.

Bertie sent Cator and Acteon to England with duplicate dispatches announcing the successful end to the campaign.Marshall (1829), Supplement–Part 3, pp.359-362.

In February 1811 the French privateer  captured the American vessel Sally, Webber, master, as Sally was sailing from Charleston to Liverpool. Acteon recaptured Sally, which arrived at Plymouth on 13 February.

That same day Cator arrived at the Admiralty; it turned out that he was the first with the good news. The Admiralty awarded him a gratuity of £500 pounds for his good news.Acteons next mission was to carry a single letter to Calcutta and return with an answer. The sickly state of her crew meant that she often spent weeks sitting with the result that the voyage took 10 months.Acteon then cruised off Cherbourg and the Norwegian coast. On 24 January 1813 Minerva, Patterson, master, and Christiansand, Sinus, master, arrived at Hull. They were prizes to Acteon, which detained Minerva as Minerva was sailing from Gothenburg to Boston. At some point Acteon escorted the Russian fleet from the Baltic to Gothenburg. She was then caught up in severe winter gales on the Norwegian coast and sustained some damage that required her to put into Sheerness for repairs.

Later in 1813 Acteon sailed to North America. On 22 September she landed marines at Lynhaven Bay by Hampton Roads. There, after a short action with American dragoons and infantry, the marines destroyed a barracks and its military stores, captured nine American soldiers, and killed and wounded several others. British casualties were one marine severely wounded.

During the very severe winter of 1813 Acteon provided watering parties for the British squadron blockading the Chesapeake. She also assisted in the capture and destruction of numerous coasting vessels.

All these vessels were coasters. The first was the New York, of 28 tons and four men. Then came the Phoebe, of 48 tons and five men. Next came the sloop Caroline, of 45 tons and five men. The fourth was the schooner Fredricksburgh, of 38 tons and two men. The fifth and sixth were the sloop Polly and the schooner Peggy, both of which the British burnt. The seventh was the schooner Lucy and Sally, of 48 tons and four men, sailing from Fredericksburgh to Onnacohe. The last was the schooner Poor Jack, of 26 tons and three men, also sailing from Fredericksburgh to Onnacohe.

In December, Acteon, again working with Sophie, destroyed or captured seven small prizes. On 11 December the burnt a schooner of 37 tons. The next day they captured the 76-ton schooner Erie and its crew of nine men. (Erie, under the command of John Hearn, had been sailing from Havana to Baltimore with a cargo of sugar and coffee.  The British unloaded the cargo and afterwards sent it to Bermuda, thereafter employing Erie as a tender to the British squadron in the Chesapeake.  There Erie too captured several prizes.) On 12 December, Sophie and Acteon burnt two small schooners, one of 25 and one of 60 tons. Then on the 16th they burnt Little Elenea, of 59 tons and two men, sailing from Charleston to Baltimore. On the same day they also burnt a 69-ton sloop.

Lastly, on 23 December Acteon and Sophie captured two vessels of 240 tons (bm). George and Betsey were both sailing from Baltimore to Lisbon.Acteon returned to Norwegian waters in 1814. On 7 June Cator received promotion to post captain. Commander John Ross (later an Arctic explorer), replaced Cator in command of Acteon.Acteon was part of a squadron of five vessels that detained Panther, Gegollae (or Gezoline), master, which was sailing from Martinique to Dunkirk. Panther arrived at Plymouth on 26 June 1815.

Fate
The principal officers and commissioners of His Majesty's Navy offered the brig Acteon, of 353 tons, for sale at Portsmouth on 11 January 1816. Acteon'' failed to sell on several sale dates. She was surveyed with the result that on 16 October the surveyors found that she was so decayed that she was no longer seaworthy. She was then broken up.

Notes

Citations

References
 
 Fonds Marine. Campagnes (opérations; divisions et stations navales; missions diverses). Inventaire de la sous-série Marine BB4. Tome premier: BB4 210 à 482 (1805–1826) 
  (1671-1870)
 
 

1804 ships
Ships built in France
Brigs of the French Navy
Captured ships
Brigs of the Royal Navy
Friendly fire incidents